Maureen Lee (1932 – 31 December 2020) was a British novelist of one hundred and fifty short-stories and dramatic historical romance novels. In 2000, her novel Dancing in the Dark won the Romantic Novel of the Year Award by the Romantic Novelists' Association.

Maureen Lee was born in Bootle, Lancashire, England, United Kingdom, near Liverpool during World War II; and lived in Colchester, Essex. She attended Commercial College and became a shorthand typist. She married Richard, and they had three sons including DJ and House music producer Dave Lee (formerly known as Joey Negro).

She published over one hundred and fifty short-stories, before publishing her first novel Lila in 1983. Since 1994, she continued to publish dramatic historical sagas mainly set in her home city of Liverpool.

Maureen Lee died on 31 December 2020 at the age of 88.

Bibliography

Single novels
 Lila (1983)
 Stepping Stones (1994)
 Annie (1998) aka Liverpool Annie
 Dancing in the Dark (1999)
 The Girl from Barefoot House (2000)
 Lacey's of Liverpool (2001)
 Lime Street Blues (2002)
 The House by Princes Park (2002)
 Queen of the Mersey (2003)
 The Old House on the Corner (2004)
 The September Girls (2005)
 Kitty and Her Sisters (2006)
 The Leaving of Liverpool (2007)
 A Dream Come True (2007)
 Mother of Pearl (2008)
 Nothing Lasts Forever (2009)
 Martha's Journey (2010)
 Au Revoir Liverpool (2011)
 Amy's Diary (2012)
 After the War Is Over (2012)
 Flora and Grace (2013)
 Violet's Children (2018)

Pearl Street
 Lights Out Liverpool (1995)
 Put Out the Fires (1996)
 Through the Storm (1997)
 The Seven Streets of Liverpool (2014)

References

1932 births
People from Bootle
2020 deaths
English romantic fiction writers
RoNA Award winners
20th-century English novelists
21st-century British novelists
20th-century English women writers
21st-century English women writers
Women romantic fiction writers
English women novelists